In fluid mechanics, hydrostatic equilibrium (hydrostatic balance, hydrostasy) is the condition of a fluid or plastic solid at rest, which occurs when external forces, such as gravity, are balanced by a pressure-gradient force. In the planetary physics of Earth, the pressure-gradient force prevents gravity from collapsing the planetary atmosphere into a thin, dense shell, whereas gravity prevents the pressure-gradient force from diffusing the atmosphere into outer space.

Hydrostatic equilibrium is the distinguishing criterion between dwarf planets and small solar system bodies, and features in astrophysics and planetary geology. Said qualification of equilibrium indicates that the shape of the object is symmetrically rounded, mostly due to rotation into an ellipsoid, where any irregular surface features are consequent to a relatively thin solid crust. In addition to the Sun, there are a dozen or so equilibrium objects confirmed to exist in the Solar System.

Mathematical consideration

For a hydrostatic fluid on Earth:

Derivation from force summation

Newton's laws of motion state that a volume of a fluid that is not in motion or that is in a state of constant velocity must have zero net force on it. This means the sum of the forces in a given direction must be opposed by an equal sum of forces in the opposite direction. This force balance is called a hydrostatic equilibrium.

The fluid can be split into a large number of cuboid volume elements; by considering a single element, the action of the fluid can be derived.

There are three forces: the force downwards onto the top of the cuboid from the pressure, P, of the fluid above it is, from the definition of pressure,

Similarly, the force on the volume element from the pressure of the fluid below pushing upwards is

Finally, the weight of the volume element causes a force downwards.  If the density is ρ, the volume is V and g the standard gravity, then:

The volume of this cuboid is equal to the area of the top or bottom, times the height — the formula for finding the volume of a cube.

By balancing these forces, the total force on the fluid is

This sum equals zero if the fluid's velocity is constant.  Dividing by A,

Or,

Ptop − Pbottom is a change in pressure, and h is the height of the volume element—a change in the distance above the ground.  By saying these changes are infinitesimally small, the equation can be written in differential form.

Density changes with pressure, and gravity changes with height, so the equation would be:

Derivation from Navier–Stokes equations
Note finally that this last equation can be derived by solving the three-dimensional Navier–Stokes equations for the equilibrium situation where

Then the only non-trivial equation is the -equation, which now reads

Thus, hydrostatic balance can be regarded as a particularly simple equilibrium solution of the Navier–Stokes equations.

Derivation from general relativity
By plugging the energy–momentum tensor for a perfect fluid

into the Einstein field equations

and using the conservation condition

one can derive the Tolman–Oppenheimer–Volkoff equation for the structure of a static, spherically symmetric relativistic star in isotropic coordinates:

In practice, Ρ and ρ are related by an equation of state of the form f(Ρ,ρ) = 0, with f specific to makeup of the star. M(r) is a foliation of spheres weighted by the mass density ρ(r), with the largest sphere having radius r:

Per standard procedure in taking the nonrelativistic limit, we let c→∞, so that the factor

Therefore, in the nonrelativistic limit the Tolman–Oppenheimer–Volkoff equation reduces to Newton's hydrostatic equilibrium:

(we have made the trivial notation change h = r and have used f(Ρ,ρ) = 0 to express ρ in terms of P). A similar equation can be computed for rotating, axially symmetric stars, which in its gauge independent form reads:
 
Unlike the TOV equilibrium equation, these are two equations (for instance, if as usual when treating stars, one chooses spherical coordinates as basis coordinates , the index i runs for the coordinates r and ).

Applications

Fluids
The hydrostatic equilibrium pertains to hydrostatics and the principles of equilibrium of fluids.  A hydrostatic balance is a particular balance for weighing substances in water.  Hydrostatic balance allows the discovery of their specific gravities.  This equilibrium is strictly applicable when an ideal fluid is in steady horizontal laminar flow, and when any fluid is at rest or in vertical motion at constant speed.  It can also be a satisfactory approximation when flow speeds are low enough that acceleration is negligible.

Astrophysics
In any given layer of a star, there is a hydrostatic equilibrium between the outward thermal pressure from below and the weight of the material above pressing inward.  The isotropic gravitational field compresses the star into the most compact shape possible. A rotating star in hydrostatic equilibrium is an oblate spheroid up to a certain (critical) angular velocity. An extreme example of this phenomenon is the star Vega, which has a rotation period of 12.5 hours. Consequently, Vega is about 20% larger at the equator than at the poles. A star with an angular velocity above the critical angular velocity becomes a Jacobi (scalene) ellipsoid, and at still faster rotation it is no longer ellipsoidal but piriform or oviform, with yet other shapes beyond that, though shapes beyond scalene are not stable.

If the star has a massive nearby companion object then tidal forces come into play as well, distorting the star into a scalene shape when rotation alone would make it a spheroid.  An example of this is Beta Lyrae.

Hydrostatic equilibrium is also important for the intracluster medium, where it restricts the amount of fluid that can be present in the core of a cluster of galaxies.

We can also use the principle of hydrostatic equilibrium to estimate the velocity dispersion of dark matter in clusters of galaxies. Only baryonic matter (or, rather, the collisions thereof) emits X-ray radiation. The baryonic density satisfies the above equation :

The integral is a measure of the total mass of the cluster, with  being the proper distance to the center of the cluster.

If we make the assumption that cold dark matter particles have an isotropic velocity distribution, then the same derivation applies to these particles, and their density  satisfies the non-linear differential equation

With perfect X-ray and distance data, we could calculate the baryon density at each point in the cluster and thus the dark matter density. We could then calculate the velocity dispersion  of the dark matter, which is given by 
 
The central density ratio  is dependent on the redshift  of the cluster and is given by
 
where  is the angular width of the cluster and  the proper distance to the cluster. Values for the ratio range from .11 to .14 for various surveys.

Planetary geology

The concept of hydrostatic equilibrium has also become important in determining whether an astronomical object is a planet, dwarf planet, or small Solar System body. According to the definition of planet adopted by the International Astronomical Union in 2006, one defining characteristic of planets and dwarf planets is that they are objects that have sufficient gravity to overcome their own rigidity and assume hydrostatic equilibrium. Such a body will often have the differentiated interior and geology of a world (a planemo), though near-hydrostatic or formerly hydrostatic bodies such as the proto-planet 4 Vesta may also be differentiated and some hydrostatic bodies (notably Callisto) have not thoroughly differentiated since their formation. Often the equilibrium shape is an oblate spheroid, as is the case with Earth. However, in the cases of moons in synchronous orbit, nearly unidirectional tidal forces create a scalene ellipsoid. Also, the purported dwarf planet  is scalene due to its rapid rotation, though it may not currently be in equilibrium.

Icy objects were previously believed to need less mass to attain hydrostatic equilibrium than rocky objects. The smallest object that appears to have an equilibrium shape is the icy moon Mimas at 396 km, whereas the largest icy object known to have an obviously non-equilibrium shape is the icy moon Proteus at 420 km, and the largest rocky bodies in an obviously non-equilibrium shape are the asteroids Pallas and Vesta at about 520 km. However, Mimas is not actually in hydrostatic equilibrium for its current rotation. The smallest body confirmed to be in hydrostatic equilibrium is the dwarf planet Ceres, which is icy, at 945 km, whereas the largest known body to have a noticeable deviation from hydrostatic equilibrium is Iapetus being made of mostly permeable ice and almost no rock. At 1,469 km Iapetus is neither spherical nor ellipsoid. Instead, it is rather in a strange walnut-like shape due to its unique equatorial ridge. Some icy bodies may be in equilibrium at least partly due to a subsurface ocean, which is not the definition of equilibrium used by the IAU (gravity overcoming internal rigid-body forces). Even larger bodies deviate from hydrostatic equilibrium, although they are ellipsoidal: examples are Earth's Moon at 3,474 km (mostly rock), and the planet Mercury at 4,880 km (mostly metal).

Solid bodies have irregular surfaces, but local irregularities may be consistent with global equilibrium. For example, the massive base of the tallest mountain on Earth, Mauna Kea, has deformed and depressed the level of the surrounding crust, so that the overall distribution of mass approaches equilibrium.

Atmospheric modeling

In the atmosphere, the pressure of the air decreases with increasing altitude. This pressure difference causes an upward force called the pressure-gradient force. The force of gravity balances this out, keeping the atmosphere bound to Earth and maintaining pressure differences with altitude.

Gemology 
Gemologists use hydrostatic balances to determine the specific gravity of gemstones. A gemologist may compare the specific gravity they observe with a hydrostatic balance with a standardized catalogue of information for gemstones, helping them to narrow down the identity or type of gemstone under examination.

See also
 List of gravitationally rounded objects of the Solar System; a list of objects that have a rounded, ellipsoidal shape due to their own gravity (but are not necessarily in hydrostatic equilibrium)
 Statics
 Two-balloon experiment

Notes

References

External links
Strobel, Nick. (May, 2001). Nick Strobel's Astronomy Notes.
 by Richard Pogge, Ohio State University, Department of Astronomy

Fluid mechanics
Astrophysics
Hydrostatics
Definition of planet
Concepts in astronomy